Jette Philipsen is a former women's cricketer for the Denmark national women's cricket team who played nine ODIs. She made her debut against Ireland during the 1995 Women's European Cricket Cup, when she scored 10 runs as a lower-order batsman. Two years later, she played five matches during the 1997 Women's Cricket World Cup. Her highest score in international cricket was 16 runs, which she scored twice; against both Pakistan and England. In all, she scored 53 runs and took one catch for Denmark.

References

Danish women cricketers
Denmark women One Day International cricketers
Living people
Year of birth missing (living people)